Policastro Bussentino (or simply Policastro) is an Italian town and hamlet (frazione) of the municipality of Santa Marina (of which it is  its seat) in the province of Salerno, Campania region. It is a former bishopric, now titular see, and has a population of 1,625.

History  
The town was founded in 470 or 471 BC as Pixous, by Micythus, the tyrant of Rhegion and Messena. It has been a Latin Rite bishopric twice, as Bussento and as Policastro, and remains a Catholic titular see as "Capo della Foresta".

During the fascist period, with the union of municipalities of Ispani and Santa Marina, Policastro became a hamlet of Capitello.

Geography
The town is located on the southern side of Cilento, not too far from the national park, in the middle of the Gulf of Policastro on the Tyrrhenian Sea. Situated by the estuary of river Bussento, it is 10 km far (north) from Sapri, 5 from Santa Marina, 4 from Scario (hamlet of San Giovanni a Piro), 25 from Marina di Camerota (hamlet of Camerota) and almost 90 from Salerno. The nearest villages by the sea are Capitello (hamlet of Ispani, far 2 km) and Villammare (hamlet of Vibonati, far 4 km).

Tourism
Policastro attracts visitors, especially in summer, due to the quality of its water, its rural surroundings and a good rail link and for camping.

Transport
The railway station is situated in the middle of the town, by the main line Rome-Naples-Reggio Calabria-Palermo/Catania. Regional trains run every hour.
The town recently inaugurated (2006) as the final track of national road SS18, which runs from Salerno - Battipaglia - Paestum - Agropoli - Vallo della Lucania - Palinuro to Sapri. Policastro has another carriageway, a variation of SS 517 that reaches Padula and the A2 Motorway exit Padula-Buonabitacolo, via Sanza.

See also 
 Cilento
 Cilento and Vallo di Diano National Park
 Roman Catholic Diocese of Policastro
 Roman Catholic Diocese of Teggiano-Policastro
 List of ancient Greek cities
 Magna Graecia
 Santa Marina

References

External links 

 Gulf and town of Policastro (IT)
 Policastro on Cilento portal (IT)

Frazioni of the Province of Salerno
Colonies of Magna Graecia
Localities of Cilento